The 1976 City of Lincoln Council election  took place on 6 May 1976. This was on the same day as other local elections.  The entire council was up for election and the Democratic Labour Party retained control of the council.

Overall results

|-
| colspan=2 style="text-align: right; margin-right: 1em" | Total
| style="text-align: right;" | 30
| colspan=5 |
| style="text-align: right;" | 24,713
| style="text-align: right;" |

Ward results

Abbey (3 seats)

Boultham (3 seats)

Bracebridge (3 seats)

Carholme (3 seats)

Castle (3 seats)

Ermine (3 seats)

Hartsholme (3 seats)

Minster (3 seats)

Moorland (3 seats)

Park (3 seats)

References

1976
1976 English local elections
1970s in Lincolnshire